Safarqoli Khan Kandi (also Romanized as Şafarqolī Khān Kandī; also known as Şafar ‘Alīkhān Kandī and Şafarqolī Kandī) is a village in Bash Qaleh Rural District, in the Central District of Urmia County, West Azerbaijan Province, Iran. At the 2006 census, its population was 119, in 36 families.

References 

Populated places in Urmia County